Rabbi Yitzchok Yaakov Weiss (15 February 1902 – 14 June 1989), commonly known as the Minchas Yitzchak after the Responsa he authored, was the rabbi of the Edah HaChareidis in Jerusalem] at the time of his death, but his halakhic influence extended well beyond the borders of his community as prominent posek (Halachic decisor), and Talmudic scholar. He was a world-renowned expert on Jewish law and his rulings are frequently cited and relied upon by rabbinic courts and scholars.

Early life
Weiss was born in the town of Dolyna in Galicia, Austria-Hungary, the son of a distinguished Chassid, Rabbi Yosef Yehuda Weiss, later spiritual leader of the Hungarian Jewish community in Munkacs. He had frequent encounters with the Ziditchover Rebbe, Rabbi Yehuda Zvi Eichenstein, until the age of seven when the latter died. However, with the onset of World War I in 1914, he moved with his parents to Munkacs in Hungary, where his father had lived before marrying. In 1918, the region was under the rule of independent Czechoslovakia.

Weiss studied under his father and received Semicha from the Munkatcher Rebbe, Rabbi Chaim Elazar Shapiro, the famed author of the Minchas Elazar. Soon after, he also received semicha from Rabbi Meir Arik of Tarna. He also became close to Rabbi Shimon Greenfield. At the age of 20 he became a Rosh yeshiva in the town.

Rabbi Weiss then served as the Av Beth Din in Grosswardein, Romania, before World War II. When Grosswardein was ceded to Hungary as a result of the Vienna Award, he fled to Romania in 1944, where his wife died after contracting an illness. He and his family managed to escape the deportation of Jews during the Nazi occupation of the area by hiding in bunkers and attics.

Post-World War II
After the war Rabbi Weiss planned to emigrate to the then Palestine but was persuaded to stay and help rebuild the Grosswardein Jewish community. With the spread of Communism in Romania however, he decided to leave the country.

Around 1949, Rabbi Weiss emigrated to Manchester, England, where he was soon appointed Dayan and Av Beth Din. His appointment was hailed as an important event in the religious life of English Jewry. The then-Chief Rabbi Sir Israel Brodie and his successor Rabbi Immanuel Jakobovits (then-Chief Rabbi of Ireland), were in attendance at Rabbi Weiss's induction in the Manchester Great Synagogue.

In 1951, a deputation led by Rabbi Brodie went to Manchester in an effort to persuade Rabbi Weiss to become a dayan of the London Beth Din but he decided to decline the invitation and decided to remain with the northern community where his piety and scholarship were greatly revered. Rabbi Weiss did much to enhance the spiritual life of the community, promoting the
establishment of a new and modern mikveh and the creation of a kollel for young scholars.

Rabbi Weiss remained in Manchester until 1970. At the suggestion of Rabbi Yoel Teitelbaum, the Satmar Rebbe, he joined the Edah HaChareidis in Jerusalem. However, this was only after his retirement as head of the Manchester Beth Din. Rabbi Weiss became the Edah Charedis head in 1979 with the death of Rabbi Yoel Teitelbaum.

Works
Rabbi Weiss authored an important ten-volume set of responsa, entitled Minchas Yitzchak, discussing many contemporary technological, social, and economic issues. In a special section therein entitled Pirsumei Nissa ("publicising of the miracle") Rabbi Weiss recorded the harrowing ordeals that he experienced in the Second World War, and his miraculous survival.

Dayan Weiss reached his decisions by the classic "Hungarian" method of consulting recent Halachic authorities and then tracing the principles thus established back to the more basic
sources of the Talmud and Codes. His fellow sage, Rabbi Moshe Feinstein of New York, worked in the opposite direction, going straight to the Talmud and especially Rambam in a search for precedents, and then applying the relevant reasoning directly to the question at hand, often without reference to any intermediate views.

Though Rabbi Weiss was often uncompromising and quite severe in his rulings, he was extremely kind by disposition and was always anxious to avoid conflicts, often in the face of severe provocation. In the modern age, there is no rabbinic court and no legal work which does not quote or rely on Rabbi Weiss's verdicts in applying Jewish law to modern conditions, particularly in the field of medical ethics.

Rabbi Weiss also authored Siach Yitzchak on Talmudical tractate Chagigah.

Death
Rabbi Weiss died of a heart attack at Bikur Cholim Hospital, on 14 June 1989, at the age of 87. An estimated 30,000 people turned out for his funeral. He was survived by a son, Berish, of Manchester.

References

External links
Yated Ne'eman biography

1902 births
1989 deaths
20th-century rabbis in Jerusalem
Rabbis of the Edah HaChareidis
Hasidic rabbis in Europe
Romanian emigrants to the United Kingdom
British emigrants to Israel
Jews from Galicia (Eastern Europe)
People from Mukachevo
Burials at the Jewish cemetery on the Mount of Olives
Czechoslovak rabbis
20th-century Romanian rabbis
20th-century English rabbis
Rabbis from Manchester